Jeremy White (born 15 October 1947) is a New Zealand cricketer. He played in one List A and seven first-class matches for Northern Districts from 1972 to 1974.

See also
 List of Northern Districts representative cricketers

References

External links
 

1947 births
Living people
New Zealand cricketers
Northern Districts cricketers